These are the list of Malaysian representatives at international male beauty contest.

Grand Slam Pageants 
Color keys

Mister World

Manhunt International

Mister International

Mister Global

Mister Supranational

Man of the World

Minor International Pageants 
Color keys

Mister Globe

Mister Universal Ambassador

Mister National Universe

Mister Grand International

Mister Tourism Universe

Mister Tourism World

Mister Tourism and Culture Universe

Mister United Continents

Mister Continental International

Mister United World

Gentleman of the World

Mister Ocean

Man of the Year

Mister Tourism Ambassador Universe

Mister Culture World

Mister Culture Asia World

Mister Diversity Culture International

Mister Friendship International

Teen Pageants

Mister Teen International

Mister Global Teen

Prince & Princess International

Past Pageants

Mr. Intercontinental

Mr. International

See also 
 Miss Malaysia
 Miss Universe Malaysia
 Miss World Malaysia
 Miss International Malaysia
 Miss Earth Malaysia
 Unduk Ngadau
 Dewi Remaja

References 

Beauty pageants in Malaysia
Male beauty pageants
Man of the World (pageant)
Mister Global by country